Oliver Gutfleisch competed for Germany in the men's standing volleyball event at the 2000 Summer Paralympics, where he won a gold medal.

See also 
 Germany at the 2000 Summer Paralympics

References

External links 
 Oliver Gutfleisch at World ParaVolley
 

Living people
Year of birth missing (living people)
Place of birth missing (living people)
German men's volleyball players
Paralympic gold medalists for Germany
Paralympic medalists in volleyball
Volleyball players at the 2000 Summer Paralympics
Medalists at the 2000 Summer Paralympics
Paralympic volleyball players of Germany